The Douglas Crossing Bridge, near Granada, Colorado, was built in 1936 as a Works Progress Administration project.  It was listed on the National Register of Historic Places in 1985.

It brings County Road 28 over Two Butte Creek.

It is a stone, ashlar-filled arch bridge.  It has six  semi-circular span arches, and was built by an eight-man crew.

References

Bridges in Colorado
National Register of Historic Places in Prowers County, Colorado
Bridges completed in 1936